Aridarum is a genus of flowering plants in the family Araceae. All of the known species in this genus are rheophytic and are endemic to the Island of Borneo. The plant is aquatic and has willow-shaped leaves that are able to take strong currents without sustaining damage.

Species
Aridarum borneense (M.Hotta) Bogner & A.Hay - Sarawak
Aridarum burttii Bogner & Nicolson -  Sarawak
Aridarum caulescens M.Hotta - Sarawak, Brunei
Aridarum crassum S.Y.Wong & P.C.Boyce - Sarawak
Aridarum incavatum H.Okada & Y.Mori - Borneo
Aridarum minimum H.Okada - Borneo
Aridarum montanum Ridl. - Sarawak
Aridarum nicolsonii Bogner - Sarawak, West Kalimantan
Aridarum purseglovei (Furtado) M.Hotta - Sarawak
Aridarum rostratum Bogner & A.Hay - West Kalimantan

References

Aroideae
Araceae genera
Endemic flora of Borneo